Bonneuil-sur-Marne (literally Bonneuil on Marne) is a commune in the Val-de-Marne department in the southeastern suburbs of Paris, France.

Population

Transport
Bonneuil-sur-Marne is served by no station of the Paris Métro, RER, or suburban rail network. The closest station to Bonneuil-sur-Marne is Sucy – Bonneuil station on Paris RER line A. This station is located in the neighboring commune of Sucy-en-Brie,  from the town center of Bonneuil-sur-Marne.

Education
Schools in the commune include:
 7 preschools (maternelles): Henri Arlès, Danielle Casanova 1, Danielle Casanova 2, Eugénie Cotton B1, Eugénie Cotton B2, Joliot Curie, Romain Rolland
 5 elementary schools: Henri Arlès, A & E. Cotton, Langevin- Wallon, Romain Rolland A, and Romain Rolland B

There is also a public junior high school, Collège Paul Eluard, and a private school, Ecole privée Notre Dame.

See also

Communes of the Val-de-Marne department

References

External links
 Bonneuil-sur-Marne official website 

Communes of Val-de-Marne
Val-de-Marne communes articles needing translation from French Wikipedia